Timothy Carl Mickelson (November 12, 1948 – August 30, 2017) was a medical electronics executive and an American rower who competed and won medals in the 1972 Summer Olympics, the 1974 World Rowing Championships, as well as the 1975 Pan American Games.

He was a six-year member of the USA rowing team. In 1972 he rowed #5 in the USA 8+ which placed second at the 1972 Summer Olympics in Munich, Germany, and in 1974 he rowed bow in the USA 8+ which won the 1974 World Rowing Championships on the Rotsee in Lucerne, Switzerland. In 1975 he was a member of the USA 8+ which placed first in the 1975 Pan American Games.

He was born in Deerfield, Wisconsin.

Mickelson was a graduate of the University of Wisconsin in Madison, WI where he earned an undergraduate degree in electrical engineering. Upon graduation, he served two years in the Army, stationed at Walter Reed Army Medical Center in Washington, DC where he worked as an environmental engineer. Following his discharge, he pursued a master's degree in biomedical engineering at Dartmouth College and a PhD in exercise physiology at Ohio University.

His career began in 1980 as a product manager at Marquette Electronics in Milwaukee, Wisconsin, where worked his way up to become the President and Chief Operating Officer of the company. After leaving Marquette Electronics in 1998, he moved to Seattle, WA to serve as CEO of ATL/Philips Medical – Ultrasound division until his retirement in 2007.

On August 30, 2017, he died of amyotrophic lateral sclerosis at his home outside Seattle, Washington at the age of 68.

References

External links
 
 
 
 

1948 births
2017 deaths
Rowers at the 1972 Summer Olympics
Olympic silver medalists for the United States in rowing
American male rowers
World Rowing Championships medalists for the United States
Medalists at the 1972 Summer Olympics
Pan American Games medalists in rowing
Pan American Games gold medalists for the United States
Neurological disease deaths in Washington (state)
Deaths from motor neuron disease
People from Deerfield, Wisconsin
Rowers at the 1975 Pan American Games
Medalists at the 1975 Pan American Games